"Darlin" is a song by American rock band the Beach Boys from their 1967 album Wild Honey. Written by Brian Wilson and Mike Love, it was inspired by singer Danny Hutton (the title word featured heavily in his vocabulary) and was originally intended to be recorded by an early version of Three Dog Night. Carl Wilson ultimately sang the lead vocal.

Released as the second single from Wild Honey, "Darlin peaked at number 19 in the U.S. and number 11 in the UK. Artists who have covered the song include David Cassidy, Paul Davis, Yipes!, Tatsuro Yamashita, Sweet Trip, and Darlin', the band that later evolved into Daft Punk.

Background and recording 

The song was initially written as "Thinkin' 'Bout You Baby" by Wilson and Love years earlier, and was first recorded in April 1964 and released as a single two months later by Sharon Marie—a teenager Love met at a June 1963 Beach Boys concert in Sonoma County and helped sign to Capitol Records—with production by Wilson himself. The track was included on the 2004 compilation Pet Projects: The Brian Wilson Productions.

In reference to "Darlin, Wilson recalled, "I was writing more in a soul/R&B bag. The horns were conceived as a Phil Spector kind of a horn thing.... That song took about a week to write." Singer Danny Hutton laid claim to inspiring the title for "Darlin, it being frequent in his vocabulary at the time.

Wilson produced the instrumental track for "Darlin on October 11, 1967. Initially, he had planned to give this song and "Time to Get Alone" to Hutton's group Redwood (later known as Three Dog Night). Redwood only got as far as recording a guide vocal before Carl Wilson and Mike Love insisted that Brian focus his attention on producing work for the Beach Boys, according to various accounts. Wilson stated in a later interview, "Darlin' was for Three Dog Night. They recorded it and said, 'No, you can have it' so I gave it to Carl to sing." Further recording on the track followed on October 27.

"Darlin features a lead vocal by Carl Wilson. When asked what song's worked best for Carl Wilson's voice, Brian Wilson singled out the track, responding, "Wow, well 'Darlin' of course, Carl did an amazing vocal on that song."

Release
"Darlin was released as a single, backed with "Here Today", on December 18, 1967, the same date as the release of the Wild Honey album. It was the second single released from the album, after "Wild Honey". Upon its release, Cash Box said that the song represented "a shift in sound from the Beach Boys into a less elaborate but extra-commercial teen beat right between mid-and-up tempo. The deck's hard-throb rhythm and very fine group sound is complemented by a good set of teen-oriented lyrics to catch a maximum of exposure on the top pop programs. Instant breakout selection."

As predicted by Cash Box, "Darlin was a commercial uptick for the band, peaking at number 19 in the US Billboard Chart and number 11 in the UK Singles Chart. It has since appeared on several live and compilation albums.

Reception and legacy
Upon release, Rolling Stone wrote in a review of the album, Darlin{{}} is the song in which the Beach Boys really take R&B styling and make it work in an original way." Jazz & Pop's Gene Sculatti commented that "a whole lot of soul is used up" on the song. 

Retrospectively, Biographer Mark Dillon decreed that the song was "ahead of its time, anticipating the blue-eyed soul of such '70s acts as Todd Rundgren and Chicago." Matthew Greenwald of AllMusic wrote of the song, "Loaded with simple emotions and sentimentality, it's a luscious piece of late-'60s pop, and not unlike the finer efforts of groups like the Turtles' 'Happy Together' and Buffalo Springfield's 'On the Way Home. Rolling Stone readers ranked the song seventh on their vote for the top ten best Beach Boys deep cuts, while writers for The Guardian and uDiscoverMusic ranked the song 24th and 13th respectively on their lists of the best Beach Boys songs.

Asked in 2015 for his favorite ever song that he had written, Wilson cited "Darlin'" and explained, "I just like the melody."

In popular culture
 French rock trio Darlin' took their name from the song. Two of its members later reformed as the electronic music duo Daft Punk, and the third joined pop band Phoenix.
 The song features in the 2015 The Big Bang Theory episode, "The Earworm Reverberation".
 Various members of Beach Boys including Mike Love were featured in several episodes of the sitcom Full House.

Personnel
Per Craig Slowinski.

The Beach Boys
 Brian Wilson piano
 Carl Wilson lead vocals, inaudible drums
 The Beach Boys backing vocals, tambourine, other percussion
Additional players
 Harold Billings trumpet
 Ron Brown bass
 Hal Blaine overdubbed drums
 Virgil Evans trumpet
 Lew McCreary bass trombone
 Jay Migliori baritone saxophone
 Ollie Mitchell trumpet

Cover versions

"Thinkin' 'Bout You Baby"
 1972 – American Spring, Spring 1993 – BMX Bandits, Kylie's Got A Crush On Us"Darlin

 1968 – Paper Dolls, Paper Dolls House 1971 – Herb Alpert & the Tijuana Brass, Summertime 1975 – David Cassidy, The Higher They Climb (w/Bruce Johnston)
1977 -- Paul Davis, Singer Of Songs, Teller Of Tales 1978 – Triumvirat, A la Carte 1984 – Tatsuro Yamashita, Big Wave 1991 – The Records, Smiles, Vibes & Harmony: A Tribute to Brian Wilson 1993 – Darlin', Shimmies in Super 8 2022 – Sweet Trip, Seen / Unseen 2022 – She & Him, Melt Away: A Tribute to Brian Wilson''

Charts

References

Bibliography

External links
 
 
 
 
 

1967 songs
1967 singles
1975 singles
1978 singles
The Beach Boys songs
Songs written by Brian Wilson
Songs written by Mike Love
Song recordings produced by the Beach Boys
David Cassidy songs
Paul Davis (singer) songs
Capitol Records singles
Bang Records singles
American soul songs
Rhythm and blues songs
Number-one singles in South Africa